Yetkin Yıldız is a Turkish journalist who was editor of the news website Aktifhaber. A court in Istanbul sentenced Yıldız to seven years and six months in prison for alleged membership of a terrorist organisation.

Yıldız was originally arrested on 22 July 2016 as part of an investigation into the anonymous Twitter account Fuat Avni, who claimed to be a government insider leaking information on the ruling Justice and Development Party (AKP). On July 24, 2016, a court in Istanbul ordered Yıldız to be detained pending trial, on charges of being a member of an alleged Gülenist terrorist organisation. He was sentenced to 7 years and 6 months, convicted of belonging to the Gulenist organisation which Turkey's government accused of orchestrating the failed July 2016 coup d'état. Yildiz was sentenced in March 2018 along with a number of other journalists who were also accused of belonging to Gulen's network. Other journalists charged in the same case included Ahmet Memiş, Ali Akkuş, Muhammed Sait Kuloğlu, Mustafa Erkan Acar, Oğuz Usluer, Ufuk Şanlı, Cuma Ulus, Mutlu Çölgeçen, Ünal Tanık, Seyid Kılıç and Davut Aydın.

Following this first conviction, Yıldız was further accused of slander by Justice and Development Party (AKP) Bursa MP Efkan Ala. Yıldız appeared in court via the video-conference system SEGBIS. Yıldız's lawyers rejected the accusations of defamation and requested a copy of the official court proceedings. The court adjourned and set the date for the next hearing on December 17, 2019.

References

Turkish journalists
Imprisoned journalists
Year of birth missing (living people)
Living people